Arthur Hilton (April 5, 1897 – October 15, 1979) was a British-born film editor and director.

Biography
Hilton was born in London and edited his first film in 1928. Shortly after, he immigrated to the US, where he worked on such films as the W. C. Fields classic comedies The Bank Dick (1940) and Never Give a Sucker an Even Break (1941), and Julien Duvivier’s portmanteau film Flesh and Fantasy (1943). Hilton was nominated for an Academy Award in 1946 for Best Film Editing for Robert Siodmak’s film noir The Killers.

Hilton later established himself as a director, with his film director credits including The Return of Jesse James (1950), The Big Chase (1954), and Cat-Women of the Moon (1953), the latter consider by The Encyclopedia of Science Fiction as "absurd [but] one of the most influential science-fiction films ever made.". Hilton's television director credits include Lassie, Mission: Impossible, Wanted Dead or Alive, and Police Story. Hilton was recognized by American Cinema Editors for his editing work on the 1977 mini-series Washington: Behind Closed Doors.

Selected filmography

1930: Captain Thunder
1931: The Virtuous Husband
1933: What Price Innocence?
1935: Swellhead
1938: Breaking the Ice
1940: The Bank Dick
1941: Keep 'Em Flying
1941: Man Made Monster
1942: Who Done It?
1942: Pardon My Sarong
1943: Flesh and Fantasy
1943: Crazy House
1944: Phantom Lady
1944: The Suspect
1944: Bowery to Broadway
1944: Ghost Catchers
1945: Scarlet Street
1945: Here Come the Co-Eds
1945: The Strange Affair of Uncle Harry
1945: The Naughty Nineties
1946: The Killers
1948: Let's Live a Little
1948: Secret Beyond the Door
1950: The Baron of Arizona
1950: The Return of Jesse James
1950: House by the River
1953: Cat-Women of the Moon
1954: The Big Chase
1973: Harry in Your Pocket

References

External links

1897 births
1979 deaths
British film editors
Recipients of the Austrian Decoration for Science and Art
Film people from London
British emigrants to the United States